Chermoula (Berber: tacermult or tacermilt) or charmoula is a marinade and relish used in Algerian, Libyan, Moroccan and Tunisian cooking. It is traditionally used to flavor fish or seafood, but it can be used on other meats or vegetables. It is somewhat similar to Latin American chimichurri.

Ingredients
Common ingredients include garlic, cumin, coriander, oil, lemon juice, and salt. Regional variations may also include preserved lemons, onion, ground chili peppers, black pepper, saffron, and other herbs.

Varieties
Chermoula recipes vary widely by region. In Sfax, Tunisia, chermoula is often served with cured salted fish during Eid al-Fitr. This regional variety is composed of dried dark raisin purée mixed with onions cooked in olive oil and spices such as cloves, cumin, chili, black pepper, and cinnamon.

A Moroccan version comprises dried parsley, cumin, paprika, and salt and pepper. The Libyan version of charmoula is served as a side dish in the summer; It contains olives, tuna and a variety of green herbs.

See also
 List of Middle Eastern dishes
Harissa
Tunisian cuisine
Moroccan cuisine
North African cuisine
List of African dishes

References

Herb and spice mixtures
Arab cuisine
Moroccan cuisine
Tunisian cuisine
Algerian cuisine
Condiments
Marinades
Garlic dishes
Tuna dishes
Olive dishes
Middle Eastern cuisine